The Rheinturm ('Rhine Tower') is a  concrete telecommunications tower in Düsseldorf, capital of the federal state (Bundesland) of North Rhine-Westphalia, Germany. Construction commenced in 1979 and finished in 1981. The Rheinturm carries aerials for directional radio, FM and TV transmitters.  It stands 172.5 metres high and houses a revolving restaurant and an observation deck at a height of 168 metres.  It is the tallest building in Düsseldorf.

The Rheinturm was inaugurated on 1 December 1981. It contains 7,500 cubic metres of concrete and weighs 22,500 tons. Before October 15, 2004, when an aerial antenna for DVB-T was mounted, it was 234.2 metres high.

The observation deck is open to public daily from 10:00 to 23:30. As a special attraction, a light sculpture on its shaft works as a clock. This sculpture was designed by Horst H. Baumann and is called  (light time level). The light sculpture on the Rheinturm is the largest digital clock in the world.

Gallery

See also 
 List of tallest structures in Germany
 List of tallest structures in Europe
 List of tallest towers in the world

References

External links

 360° interactive panorama
Rheinturm Restaurants QOMO and M 168 , Centro Hotels Group 
 
 time lapse of tower and clock at new years fire work

Literature 
 Klaus Müller, Hermann Wegener, Heinz-Gerd Wöstemeyer: Rheinturm Düsseldorf: Daten und Fakten Triltsch Verlag, Düsseldorf 1990, .
 Roland Kanz: Architekturführer Düsseldorf. Dietrich Riemer Verlag, Berlin 2001, S. 81.
 Klaus Englert: … in die Jahre gekommen. Der Rheinturm in Düsseldorf. In db Deutsche Bauzeitung 141, 2007, Nr.6, S. 85–88, ISSN 0721-1902.
 Erwin Heinle, Fritz Leonhardt: Türme aller Zeiten, aller Kulturen. Deutsche Verlags-Anstalt, Stuttgart 1997, S. 235.

Towers completed in 1981
Buildings and structures in Düsseldorf
Towers with revolving restaurants
Tourist attractions in Düsseldorf
Communication towers in Germany
Observation towers
1981 establishments in West Germany